Sandpaper and glasspaper are names used for a type of coated abrasive that consists of sheets of paper or cloth with abrasive material glued to one face.

There are many varieties of sandpaper, with variations in the paper or backing, the material used for the grit, grit size, and the bond.

In the modern manufacture of these products, sand and glass have been replaced by other abrasives such as aluminium oxide or silicon carbide. It is common to use the name of the abrasive when describing the paper, e.g. "aluminium oxide paper", or "silicon carbide paper".

Sandpaper is produced in a range of grit sizes and is used to remove material from surfaces, whether to make them smoother (for example, in painting and wood finishing), to remove a layer of material (such as old paint), or sometimes to make the surface rougher (for example, as a preparation for gluing). The grit size of sandpaper is usually stated as a number that is inversely related to the particle size. A small number such as 20 or 40 indicates a coarse grit, while a large number such as 1500 indicates a fine grit.

History 
The first recorded instance of sandpaper was in 13th-century China when crushed shells, seeds, and sand were bonded to parchment using natural gum.

Shark skin (placoid scales) has also been used as an abrasive, and the rough scales of the Coelacanth are used for the same purpose by the natives of Comoros. Boiled and dried, the rough horsetail plant is used in Japan as a traditional polishing material, finer than sandpaper.

Glass paper was manufactured in London in 1833 by John Oakey, whose company had developed new adhesive techniques and processes, enabling mass production. Glass frit has sharp-edged particles and cuts well whereas sand grains are smoothed down and do not work well as an abrasive. Cheap sandpaper was often passed off as glass paper; Stalker and Parker cautioned against it in A Treatise of Japaning and Varnishing published in 1688.

In 1921, 3M invented a sandpaper with silicon carbide grit and a waterproof adhesive and backing, known as Wet and dry. This allowed use with water, which would serve as a lubricant to carry away particles that would otherwise clog the grit. Its first application was in automotive paint refinishing.

Coated abrasive

A coated abrasive is an abrasive grain bonded to a flexible substrate using adhesives. Common substrates are paper, cloth, vulcanized fiber, and plastic films and come in grit sizes range from very coarse (~2 mm) to ultrafine (submicrometre). The international standard for coated abrasives is ISO 6344. Sandpaper and emery cloth are coated abrasives for hand use, usually non-precision. Other coated abrasive forms include sanding cords, pads, belts, and discs. Variants are available for use by hand or as components for power tools such as sanders, die grinders and belt sanders.

Mounting systems 

A quick change system is commonly used with disc type coated abrasives. A plastic or metal hub is bonded to one of the faces, which is threaded. This then mates directly to the sander/grinder or to a mandrel that can be mounted in a sander, grinder, or drill. The advantage is that the disc can be quickly replaced when needed.

Backing 

In addition to paper, backing for sandpaper includes cloth (cotton, polyester, rayon), PET film, "fibre", and rubber. Cloth backing is used for sandpaper discs and belts, while mylar is used as backing for extremely fine grits. Fibre or vulcanized fibre is a strong backing material consisting of many layers of polymer impregnated paper. The weight of the backing is usually designated by a letter. For paper backings, the weight ratings range from "A" to "F", with A designating the lightest and F the heaviest. Letter nomenclature follows a different system for cloth backings, with the weight of the backing rated J, X, Y, T, and M, from lightest to heaviest. A flexible backing allows sandpaper to follow irregular contours of a workpiece; relatively inflexible backing is optimal for regular rounded or flat surfaces. Sandpaper backings may be glued to the paper or form a separate support structure for moving sandpaper, such as used in sanding belts and discs. Stronger paper or backing increases the ease of sanding wood. The harder the backing material, the faster the sanding, the faster the wear of the paper and the rougher the sanded surface.

Abrasives 

Types of abrasive materials include:

 Glass: No longer commonly used.
 Flint: No longer commonly used.
 Garnet: Commonly used in woodworking.
 Emery: Commonly used to abrade or polish metals.
 Aluminium oxide: The most common in modern use, with the widest variety of grits, lowest unit cost; can be used on metal (i.e. body shops) or wood.
 Silicon carbide: Available in very coarse grits all the way through to microgrits, common in wet applications.
 Alumina-zirconia: (An aluminium oxide–zirconium oxide alloy), used for machine grinding applications.
 Chromium(III) oxide: Used in extremely fine micron grit (micrometre level) papers.
 Diamond: Used for finishing and polishing hard metals, ceramics and glass.
 Ceramic aluminum oxide: Used in high pressure applications, used in both coated abrasives, as well as in bonded abrasives.

Sandpaper may be "stearated" where a dry lubricant is loaded to the abrasive. Stearated papers are useful in sanding coats of finish and paint as the stearate "soap" prevents clogging and increases the useful life of the sandpaper.

The harder the grit material, the easier the sanding of harder surfaces like hardwoods such as hickory, pecan, or wenge. The grit material for polishing granite must be harder than granite.

Bonds 

Different adhesives are used to bond the abrasive to the paper. Hide glue is still used, but this glue often cannot withstand the heat generated during machine sanding and is not waterproof. Waterproof sandpapers or wet/dry sandpapers use a resin bond and a waterproof backing.

Sandpaper can be either closed coat or open coat. Approximately 90% to 95% of the surface is covered with abrasive grains with a closed coat. Closed coat sandpaper is good for hand sanding or working with harder materials. In comparison, 50% to 70% of the surface is covered with abrasive grains with open coat sandpaper. The separation between particles makes the sandpaper more flexible, which prevents the sandpaper from clogging. However, the gaps in grit coverage limits the sandpaper's ability to perform even polishing jobs. Open coat sandpaper is better for softer materials.

Wet and dry sandpaper is more effective used wet because clogging is reduced by particles washing away from the grinding surface.

Shapes 

Sandpaper comes in a number of different shapes and sizes:

 sheet: usually , but other sizes may be available
 belt: usually cloth backed, comes in different sizes to fit different belt sanders.
 disk: made to fit different models of disc and random orbit sanders. May be perforated for some models of sanders. Attachment includes pressure-sensitive adhesive (PSA) and "hook-and-loop" (similar to Velcro).
 rolls: known as "shag rolls" by many contractors
 sponge: for tight places

Grit sizes 

Grit size refers to the size of the particles of abrading materials embedded in the sandpaper. These measurements are determined by the amount of the abrasive material that can fit through a square inch filter. Several standards have been established for grit size. These standards establish not only the average grit size, but also the allowable variation from the average. The two most common are the United States CAMI (Coated Abrasive Manufacturers Institute, now part of the Unified Abrasives Manufacturer's Association) and the European FEPA (Federation of European Producers of Abrasives) "P" grade. The FEPA system is the same as the ISO 6344 standard. Other systems used in sandpaper include the Japanese Industrial Standards Committee (JIS), the micron grade (generally used for very fine grits). Cheaper sandpapers may sometimes only use descriptive nomenclature such as "coarse", "medium" and "fine" without referring to any standard.

The following table, compiled from the references at the bottom, compares the CAMI and "P" designations with the average grit size in micrometres (µm).

Emery cloth

Emery cloth is a type of coated abrasive that has emery glued to a cloth backing. It is used for hand metalworking. It may be sold in sheets or in narrow rolls, typically 25 or 50 mm wide, often described as "emery tape". The cloth backing makes emery cloth stronger in tension than paper, but still allows a sheet to be conveniently torn to size. Emery (largely displaced by improved products such as aluminum oxide and silicon carbide) is used for scrubbing highly abraded  and rough surfaces to a smooth and shiny finish, notably in watchmaking  Emery paper, more commonly seen, has a paper backing and is usually a finer grit.

Emery was considered a suitable abrasive for fitting work and the final adjustment of steel parts for a perfect fit. It had the advantage that, unlike harder abrasives, it was not considered to embed abrasive traces in the polished components afterwards. Emery was also used for cleaning, as a means of removing rust from polished steel components.

Both emery cloth and paper are still sold in hardware and do it yourself stores, but have been largely supplanted by the increased use of machine grinding to precision size, which has minimized or eliminated the need for hand-fitting; the widespread availability of powered hand tools employing sanding and grinding accessories such as flapwheels; and a shift to other forms of abrasive, such as aluminum oxide, aluminium zirconia and silicon carbide.

Grades 
Emery is rated on the average grit size, glued to the backing. Common sizes are, from coarse to fine: 40, 46, 54, 60, 70, 80, 90, 100, 120, 180, 220, 320, F, and FF. A 46 or 54 grade cloth is used on roughly filed work, while 220 to 320 grit cloth will give a good polish.

Similar products
Sandpaper tends to be a generic term for several simiar abrasive papers and cloths

Wet & Dry
Abrasive papers and cloths with a waterproof backing allow the use of a lubricant, typically water, which can both decapitate rough surfaces when used dry and produce a semi-polished satin type finish when wet. Super-fine grades can produce a "key" adhesion surface appropriate for spray painting in critical decorative applications such as automotive bodywork repair

Crocus

A very soft abrasive, usually ultra-fine Jeweler's rouge, for fine hand-polishing of hard surfaces that require the smoothest finish possible.

See also 
 Belt sander
 Dremel
 Emery (mineral)
 Grain size
 Grind
 Grinding machine
 Polishing
 Rotary tool
 Sander
 Sanding block
 Sanding sealer
 Steel abrasive

References

Further reading 

 Dresdner, Michael (1992). The Woodfinishing Book. Taunton Press. 
 Flexner, Bob (2005). Understanding Wood Finishing — How to Select and Apply the Right Finish. Fox Chapel Publishing. ISBN Hardcover:978-1-56523-548-9. ISBN Paperback:978-1-56523-566-3

External links 

 Federation of European Producers of Abrasives
 sizes.com on sandpaper
 Conversion Chart Abrasives - Grit Sizes

Abrasives
Chinese inventions
Paper products
Surface finishing